This article lists the civil airports, some joint with military airbases and small airports in Pakistan. There are an estimated 151 airfields in Pakistan.
Major international airports are situated in Karachi, Islamabad and Lahore. Other international airports are situated in Peshawar, Multan, Sialkot, Faisalabad, Quetta, Rahim Yar Khan, Turbat, Gwadar, D.G.Khan, Tharparkar, Sukkur and Skardu .

Civil airports in Pakistan are operated by the Pakistan Civil Aviation Authority, with the exception of Sialkot International Airport, which is the first privately owned airport in Pakistan and South Asia, open to domestic and international civil aviation. It is owned and operated by the Sialkot Chamber of Commerce & Industry.

Military airbases are generally operated by the Pakistan Air Force, the exceptions being Dhamial Army Aviation Airbase in Rawalpindi and Tarbela Army Aviation Airbase which are operated by the Pakistan Army.

Gallery

Civilian list 
Names shown in bold indicate the airport has scheduled service on commercial airlines.

Military list

Major traffic flows by airport

See also 
 Dry ports, sea ports and railway stations in Pakistan
 Air Bases of Pakistan Air Force
 Airlines of Pakistan
 Transport in Pakistan
 List of airports by ICAO code: O#OP – Pakistan
 Wikipedia: Airline destination lists: Asia#Pakistan

References 

 
 
 Pakistan Civil Aviation Authority
 List of aerodromes & heliports in Pakistan, with links extracts of AIP Pakistan 6th edition (1999-12-26)

External links 

 Lists of airports in Pakistan:
 Great Circle Mapper
 FallingRain.com
 Aircraft Charter World
 The Airport Guide
 World Aero Data
 A-Z World Airports

 
Pakistan
Pakistan
Airports
Airports